Emhoff is a surname. Notable people with the name include:

 Doug Emhoff (born 1964), American lawyer and U.S. Second Gentleman (since 2021)
 Ella Emhoff (born 1999), American fashion designer and model, daughter of Doug
 Kerstin Emhoff (born 1967), American film producer and CEO, ex-wife of Doug